Mamdouh Muhammad Salem (May 7, 1918 – February 24, 1988) was the 39th Prime Minister of Egypt from April 16, 1975 to October 2, 1978.

Biography
Salem was born in Alexandria, Egypt. He served as governor of Asyut, Gaarbiya and Alexandria from 1967 to May 1971 and then served as Minister of Interior from May 1971 to 1975. In 1976 he founded and headed the Egyptian Arab Socialist party.

After three years as prime minister, On October 5, 1978, President Anwar Sadat dismissed his ministry , then he was appointed as an advisor to the President of the Republic. Then President Anwar Sadat appointed a new government with its new premier Mustafa Khalil. Salem later died in London of an unknown illness.

References

1918 births
1988 deaths
20th-century prime ministers of Egypt
Egyptian political party founders
Interior Ministers of Egypt
Politicians from Alexandria
Governors of Alexandria
Governors of Asyut
Governors of Gharbia